Celtic went into the 2002–03 season defending their Scottish Premier League title, which they won in 2001–02.

They also entered the UEFA Champions League at the qualifying stage, as well as taking part in the two domestic cup competitions, the Scottish Cup and the Scottish League Cup.

Season overview

League campaign
Celtic lost out on the title on the last day of the season despite a 4–0 win at Kilmarnock, with a goal difference of 1 less than Rangers over the whole season.

European campaign
Celtic went into third qualifying stage of the Champions League but failed to beat Basel. They then dropped down into the UEFA Cup where they beat teams including Blackburn Rovers, Stuttgart and Liverpool to reach the final where they lost 2–3 after extra time to Porto.

Domestic cups
Celtic reached the final of the Scottish League Cup, but a late penalty miss by John Hartson meant the trophy went to Rangers. As the number of games to be played took its toll, an inexperienced Celtic side lost to Inverness CT in the Scottish Cup.

Competitions

Player statistics

Appearances and goals

List of squad players, including number of appearances by competition

|}

Team statistics

League table

Transfers

In

Out

References

Celtic F.C. seasons
Celtic